Magnus Sheffield (born April 19, 2002) is an American cyclist who currently rides for UCI WorldTeam .

Magnus Sheffield left  in August 2021 for unknown reasons ahead of his 2022 season with Ineos.

In April 2022 Sheffield won Brabantse Pijl, one of the Flanders Classics races. He finished +0:37 ahead of French riders Warren Barguil and Benoît Cosnefroy becoming the first American to win this race and the first American to win any one of these classics since Tyler Farrar over a decade ago.

Major results

Road

2019
 2nd Overall Keizer der Juniores
1st Young rider classification
1st Stages 1 & 2b
 3rd  Road race, UCI World Junior Championships
 3rd Overall Grand Prix Rüebliland
1st Young rider classification
 8th Overall Driedaagse van Axel
1st Young rider classification
2020
 1st  Overall Valley of the Sun Stage Race
1st Stage 1
2021
 10th Time trial, UCI World Under-23 Championships
2022
 1st Brabantse Pijl
 1st Stage 3 Vuelta a Andalucía
 2nd Overall Danmark Rundt
1st  Young rider classification
1st Stage 2 (ITT)
 National Championships
2nd Time trial
3rd Road race
 6th Overall Tour of Norway
 10th Overall Tour of Britain
2023
 4th Overall Tour Down Under
1st  Young rider classification

Cyclo-cross

2018–2019
 1st  Pan American Junior Championships
 3rd National Junior Championships
2019–2020
 3rd National Junior Championships

References

External links

2002 births
Living people
American male cyclists
People from Pittsford, New York
Cyclists from New York (state)